The 2010 Nordic Opening or the first Ruka Triple was the first edition of the Nordic Opening, an annual cross-country skiing event. The three-day event was the second competition round of the 2010–11 FIS Cross-Country World Cup, after Gällivare, Sweden.

World Cup points distribution 
The winners of the overall standings were awarded 200 World Cup points and the winners of each of the three stages were awarded 50 World Cup points.

A total of 350 points was possible to achieve if one athlete won all three stages and the overall standings.

Overall standings

Overall leadership by stage

References 

2010–11 FIS Cross-Country World Cup
2010
2010 in cross-country skiing
November 2010 sports events in Europe